General Sir John William Floyd, 1st Baronet (22 February 1748 – 10 January 1818), was a British cavalry officer.

Family and early life
Born on 22 February 1748, he was the oldest child of Captain John Floyd and Mary Floyd (née Bate).

Career
He was commissioned on 5 April 1760 as a Cornet in the Eliott's Light Horse, a recently raised regiment which became the 15th The King's Hussars. He was commissioned Lieutenant on 20 April 1763 and Captain-Lieutenant on 20 May 1770. He was commissioned Captain on 25 May 1772 into the 15th (The King's) Regiment of (Light) Dragoons and Major of the 21st Light Dragoons on 5 May 1779. On 24 September 1779 he was commissioned and gazetted as Lieutenant-Colonel of the newly formed cavalry regiment for duty in India called the 23rd Light Dragoons, and later renamed the 19th Light Dragoons. He was commissioned Colonel on 18 November 1790.

He was appointed to command all cavalry and military units on the coast of India by Lord Cornwallis in 1790. In the Third Anglo-Mysore War (1790–1792), he led cavalry forces against Tipu Sultan, including a notable defeat in which he lost 300 horses just before the 1791 siege of Bangalore.

He was promoted Major-General on 5 October 1794 and appointed Colonel of the 23rd Light Dragoons on 14 September 1800. On 1 January 1801, he was commissioned Lieutenant-General. He was transferred as colonel to the 8th Light Dragoons on 13 September 1804 and commissioned full General on 1 January 1812.

Post military
In 1800 he returned to England, and then served for some years on the General Staff in Ireland. Floyd was made a baronet in 1816. He died suddenly of gout early in 1818.

He married firstly Rebecca Juliana Darke, daughter of Charles Darke of Madras, and secondly Anna Morgell, daughter of Crosbie Morgell of County Kerry, and widow of Sir Barry Denny, 2nd Baronet. By his first wife he had three children, including Julia Peel, wife of Sir Robert Peel.

References

Sources
Wickwire, Franklin and Mary. Cornwallis: The Imperial Years; 

British Army generals
Baronets in the Baronetage of the United Kingdom
15th The King's Hussars officers
19th Light Dragoons officers
8th King's Royal Irish Hussars officers
1748 births
1818 deaths
British military personnel of the Third Anglo-Mysore War